Maracaiba meridensis is a species of skink found in Venezuela.

References

Maracaiba
Reptiles described in 2005
Reptiles of Venezuela
Endemic fauna of Venezuela
Taxa named by Aurélien Miralles
Taxa named by Gilson Rivas
Taxa named by Walter E. Schargel